Eerola is a Finnish surname. Notable people with the surname include:

Albert Eerola (1874–1950), Finnish farmer and politician
Juho Eerola (born 1975), Finnish politician
Kalle Eerola (born 1983), Finnish football midfielder 
Ville-Veikko Eerola (born 1992), Finnish ice hockey defenceman

Finnish-language surnames